Rosemary Morris also known as Rosie Morris (born 31 January 1986) is a British water polo player. She competed for Great Britain in the women's tournament at the 2012 Summer Olympics. This was the first ever Olympic GB women's water polo team.

She competed at the 2013 World Aquatics Championships.

See also
 List of women's Olympic water polo tournament goalkeepers

References

1986 births
Living people
British female water polo players
Water polo goalkeepers
Olympic water polo players of Great Britain
Water polo players at the 2012 Summer Olympics